Oliver O'Connor Barrett (January 17, 1908 in Eltham, London, England – July 1989 in Cwm Prysor, Trawsfynydd, Wales) was a British sculptor, painter, graphic artist, educator, poet and composer. Most of his adult career and recognition was in the United States.

Life and art career

Oliver O'Connor Barrett studied at Fircroft College in England but was largely self-taught as a sculptor. In 1933 Barrett exhibited at the Royal Academy. In 1937-38 he  carved a panel, The Temptation of St. Anthony and fifteen keystones for a block of flats, called Viceroy Close, in Edgbaston, Birmingham.  The work was designed and executed in the almost cartoonish manner that was to become one of the several styles that Barrett was comfortable in.

In 1940 he moved to the United States where he settled with his family in New York City.  In 1942 he exhibited at the New Orleans Art Center, in 1945 at the Pennsylvania Academy of the Fine Arts and in 1946, 1948 and 1950 at Audubon Artists.

Barrett was one of the sculptors who exhibited at the 3rd Sculpture International, sponsored by the Fairmount Park Art Association and held at the Philadelphia Museum of Art in 1949.

Sculpture Continuum

In 1962, as the 1964 New York World's Fair was being planned, Barrett was commissioned to create the Sculpture Continuum Playground.  In his book Myself Emerging it states that the "CONTINUUM principle was invented and patented by Barrett in America.  Other designs based on the principle are available, adapted to various environmental situations."  It is unclear as to what became of the playground following the end of the fair in 1965.  Regarding this work, Barrett quotes a letter from the eminent art historian Herbert Read in which Read states, "You have given a new spacial development to the Art of sculpture."

The Sculpture Continuum playground was disassembled and stored for a while under the Van Wyck Expressway after the World's Fair closed in 1965, next to the disassembled World's Fair Pavilion (a geodesic dome).  Eventually the dome was reassembled nearby and now serves as the Bird Aviary for the Queens Zoo.  The Sculpture Continuum was acquired by Long Island's Valley Stream Union Free School District (District 13), where it was installed as playground equipment at Willow Road Elementary.  After many years of outdoor use, it was moved into storage by the school district.  Eventually at least three of the best pieces, including the elephant and the giraffe, were returned to district elementary schools for outdoor display (but not playground use).  The elephant is displayed in front of Willow Road Elementary, and another piece is believed to be at Dever Elementary.

In New York, Barrett taught as Instructor of Sculpture at the Cooper Union Art School and the Museum of Modern Art. In the ensuing years he lived in several American cities including New Orleans, Louisiana and Palm Beach, Florida, where he served as head of the art department at the Norton School of Art before returning to Great Britain and retiring to the Welsh valley of Cwm Prysor, near Trawsfynydd.

Some of his artwork is in the collection of Birmingham Museum & Art Gallery, in the UK. His papers are in the collection of the Smithsonian Archives of American Art.

Myself Emerging

In 1980 Barrett published the book, Myself Emerging, consisting primarily of selections of his poetry interspersed with photographs of his sculpture.  The book is prefaced with the statement, "With age, my development as a man, and perhaps as a poet, seems to have accelerated. Feelings are more intense and, becoming more open. I receive their full impact, whether joy or pain. Nor do I feel the need to justify or make them consistent."  An intensely personal side of Barrett is revealed in his early poems.  First Love (1927) finds him longing to be "crushed beneath a last caress of your all too-powerful hand", while in Lonely One, written during World War II, the author wants to grieve, but is restrained from doing so by those who dictate "KEEP A STIFF UPPER LIP AND DON'T GIVE WAY! DON'T FEEL DON'T THINK DON'T BROOD DON'T BE."

In the book the reader can trace the development of Barrett's style from his early purely figurative work of the 1930s through the abstracting of his figures during the 1950s and 1960s and finally a return to the realistic portraiture in his last years.  In looking at the body of work, poetic and sculptural, that is presented in the book it is clear that the themes that Barrett was interested in, spirituality, mythology, eroticism and a love of music, were ones that he was drawn to early in his life and never abandoned.

A poem "Isaak Speaks", written in September 1979, addresses the biblical story, where Abraham is so devoted to God that he is prepared to sacrifice his own son, although at the last minute an angel stops this from happening. In Barrett's short poem, "Being conceivable is deed enough" and the thought is enough to wreak the destruction. It ends:
O Father Abraham
I am unsexed
your knife is buried in my brain.

Prizes
Audubon Artists' Prize (1948)
Audubon Artists' Medal (1950)

Selected books
Barrett, Oliver O'Connor (1950). Little Benny Wanted a Pony.  Illustrated by Scarry, Richard.  Simon and Schuster.
Barrett, Connor (1980). Myself Emerging; A Book of Sculpture and Poetry.

References

Barrett, Connor (1980), Myself Emerging; A Book of Sculpture and Poetry
Who Was Who in American Art.  Edited by Falk, Peter Hastings (1985).  Madison Connecticut: Sound View Press. 
Noszlopy, George T. (1998), Public Sculpture in Birmingham: including Sutton Coldfield.  Edited by Beach, Jeremy.  Liverpool: Liverpool University Press.  
Mantle Fielding’s Dictionary of American Painters, Sculptors & Engravers. Edited by Opitz, Glenn B (1986). Poughkeepsie NY: Apollo Book.   
Obituary, Caernarfon Herald, Friday July 10, 1987.

Notes

External links
Page about Connor Barrett, including link to a display of his art works on Flickr
elephant from Barrett's Sculpture Continuum at Willow Road Elementary, Valley Stream, NY
Sculpture at Viceroy Close, Edgbaston, Birmingham

1908 births
1989 deaths
People from Eltham
Alumni of Fircroft College
20th-century British sculptors
British male sculptors
20th-century British male artists